There are three lighthouses in Dominica, an island country in the Caribbean Lesser Antilles.

Lighthouses

(*) NGA denomination

See also
 Lists of lighthouses and lightvessels

References

External links
 

Dominica
Lighthouses
Lighthouses